Laura Hill may refer to:
 Laura Hill (squash player)
 Laura Hill (actress)